Gladys Nasikanda (born 25 July 1978) is a Kenyan volleyball player. She was part of the Kenya women's national volleyball team.

She competed with the Kenyan national team at the 2000 and 2004 Olympics. She played with Union University in 2004.

Clubs
  Union University (2004)

References

External links
 Gladys Nasikanda at Sports Reference
 Kenya: Nasikanda Recalled in Kenya Team

1978 births
Living people
Kenyan women's volleyball players
Place of birth missing (living people)
Volleyball players at the 2000 Summer Olympics
Volleyball players at the 2004 Summer Olympics
Olympic volleyball players of Kenya